The Morning Eagle is a tour boat located on Lake Josephine in Glacier National Park. The vessel was constructed in 1945, by J.W. Swanson and Arthur J. Burch. The Morning Eagle was originally named Big Chief and was launched on Swiftcurrent Lake. The name was changed in 1960 and the vessel was moved to Lake Josephine. It was listed on the National Register of Historic Places in 2018. All  of the vessel's maintenance is conducted on-site.

Specifications 
The Morning Eagle is a  carvel-planked wooden vessel with cedar on an oak frame. It has a maximum occupancy of 49 passengers.

References

1945 ships
National Register of Historic Places in Glacier County, Montana
National Register of Historic Places in Glacier National Park
Water transportation on the National Register of Historic Places
1945 establishments in Montana
Boats